Socrates Hernandez Topacio (June 19, 1952 - July 21, 2017) was a Filipino comedian, actor, writer and director.

Early life, education and career
Topacio was born on June 19, 1952 in Manila, Philippines. He studied at the University of the Philippines Diliman, shifting in at least three courses until he dropped out to focus on a burgeoning showbiz career.

Topacio joined Philippine Educational Theater Association in 1969 and has been involved with several of its productions. He was given a lifetime achievement award by Philstage. Film director Lino Brocka introduced him to television and allowed him to direct productions in another medium.

Topacio dabbled in acting. Despite being publicly known as a homosexual, he also portrayed characters who are straight in film, such as in Tatlong Taong Walang Diyos; later in his career, he portrayed gay characters on television.

Topacio was nominated in the 1977 FAMAS Awards for Best Production Design for Mortal. Topacio directed Ded na si Lolo, the Philippine entry for the 2010 Academy Awards for Best Foreign Language Film.

Filmography

Actor for Theater
willow tree - araullo high school 1968/ director: Melvi Pacubas
kintin - araullo high school 1969/ dir: Melvi Pacubas
indio - PETA 1969/ dir: Nonon Padilla jr.
dumb waiter - PETA 1970/ dir: Jonas Sebastian
tatay mong kalbo - PETA 1970/ dir: Cecile Guidote
donya clara - PETA 1971/ dir: Cecile Guidote
labyrinth - PETA 1971/ dir: Ladislav Smocek
tao - PETA 1971/ dir: Cecile Guidote
chinese wall - PETA 1972/ dir: Brooks Jones
kalbaryo - PETA 1972/ dir: Brooks Jones
butihing babae ng setsuan - PETA 1972/ dir: Brooks Jones
halimaw - PETA 1971 dir: Nonon Padilla jr.
subu - PETA - 1971/ dir: Ahmed Zaki
inspektor heneral - PETA 1972/ dir: Gardy Labad
aidao - PETA 1972/ dir: Cecile Guidote
paglilitis ng mag serapio - PETA 1972/ dir: Nonon Padilla jr.
ang piging - PETA 1973/ dir: Soxie H. Topacio
ay puso - Babaylan 1974/ dir: Dez Bautista
man with the flower in his mouth - / Loretta Lichauco
kabesang tales - PETA 1974 dir: Nonon Padilla jr.
moniko at ang higante - PETA 1974 dir: Nonon Padilla jr.
dupluhang bayan - PETA 1974/ dir: gardy Labad
ang tao hayop o tao / dir: Nanding Josef
awit na hindi matapus tapos - PETA 1975/ dir: Soxie H. topacio
artista sa palengke - PETA 1976/ dir: Maryo delos Reyes
boys in the band - 1977/ dir: Tony Espejo
hatol ng guhit na bilog - PETA 1974/ dir: Fritz Bennewitz
flores para los muertos - PETA 1975/ dir: Lino Brocka
lalake, babae atbp - PETA 1977/ dir: Orlando Nadres
senaculo - dir: Eddie Infante
ten little fairies - / dir: Tony Espejo
bombita - Gantimpala / dir: Tony Espejo
panunuluyan - PETA/ dir: Joel Lamangan
hanggang dito na lamang at maraming salamat po / dir: Orlando Nadres
hobe - PETA 1978/ dir: Gardy Labad
casa de verde - / dir: maryo de los Reyes
macbeth - PETA / dir: Fritz Bennewitz
sex a deal - / dir: Maryo de los Reyes
one man show /
faust - PETA/ dir: Fritz Bennewitz
show girls - Green room/ dir: Roni Bertubin
romulus d greyt - PETA 2007/ dir: Maribel Legarda

Actor for Film
May Isang Brillanten - Lea Prod./ Romy Suzara
Lupang Hinirang - Lea Prod./ Orlando Nadres
Tatlo Dalawa isa - / Lino Brocka
Bomba Star - Regal Entertainment/ Joey Gosiengfiao
Kontrobersiyal - Regal Entertainment/ Lino Brocka
Dodong Diamond - / Emmanuel H. Borlaza
Tisoy - / Yshmael Bernal
Tatlong Taong walang Diyos -/ Mario O'Hara
Nakawain ang Araw sa Mundong Makasalan -/ Lupita Kashiwahara
Vontes 5 -/ Jun Urbano
Mr. One Two Three / Mike Relon Makiling
Tag-ulan sa Tag-araw -/ Celso Ad Castillo
High School Circa -/ Maryo delos Reyes
Twilight Dancer -/ Mel Chionglo
Ang Tsimay At Ang Tambay (1979) Sampaguita Pictures -/ Junn P. Cabreira 
Unang yakap - / Eddie Rodriguez
Blue Jeans - / Joey Gosiengfiao
Ang Nanay kong tatay - / Lino Brocka
Anak ni Brocka - (indi)/ Zieg
Pedrong Palad -/ Nick de Ocampo
Burgis - / Lino Brocka
Pacita M. -/ Elwood perez
Ispiritista: Itay, may moomoo! / APT Entertainment/ Tony Reyes
Big Time (2005)
Funeraria Toti, La / Rhayan Carlos
Magtoning muna tayo /Mike Rellon Makiling
High School Circa '65 / Maryo delos Reyes
Tsimay at ang tambay, Ang / Jun Cabreira
Bwakaw (2015)  - / Zaldy - also Soxies Last Movie

Actor for Television
Duplex - channel 9
Pitik Bulag - Channel 4
It's a Deal - Channel 9
Ready na ako Direk - Channel 9
Lucky 13 - Channel 13
several guesting in several tv shows since 1971

Director for Film
Ikaw Na Sana - (1994) Regal Films
Reyna: ang makulay na pakikipagsapalaran ng mga achucherva, achuchuva, achechenes... (2006) VIVA Films
Puso 3 (2006)a-3-Episode Indi with Rhayan Carlos and Peque Gallaga
Ded na si Lolo - (2009) APT Entertainment
D' Kilabots Pogi Brothers Weh?! - (2012) APT Entertainment, M-Zet Productions
The Adventures of Pureza: Queen of the Riles - (2011) Star Cinema

Director for Television

TV Series
True Stories - Hosted by Rosa Rosal
Carmi (martin)
Kristal (Lani Mercado)
POPCOM (12 episodes -maynila)
Komiks
Dear Diary
Ikaw Lang Nag mamahalin
Pira-pirasong Pangarap
Daboy en dagirl
Marinara
Nuts Entertainment
Maynila - Hosted by Lito Atienza
Family Zoo
Takeshi's Castle
Kung Mawawala ka
Impostora
Atlantika
Sa Iyong Paglisan
O Mare Ko
Joey's Quirky World
several GMA telesines and other drama anthologies

Director for Theater
Ang Babae sa Bote - PETA
Hayop man ay Lumuluha rin - PETA
Ang piging - PETA
Iskandalo sa Laot - PETA
Lazy John meets Yvonne darna
Indarapatra - PETA
Awit na hindi Matapus-tapos - PETA
Madilim ang Gabi sa Laot - PETA
Monumento - PETA
Peryante - PETA
Magsasaka - Gantimpala
Joe Hill - PETA
Mariang Aliw - PETA
Canuplin - PETA
Kasalan sa Likod ng Simbahan
Filipinas Circa 1906 - PETA
Oppenheimer - PETA
Feel na Feel
Panata sa Kalayaan - PETA
Amah-Maid in Hongkong - PETA
Apat sa Langit
Mac-liing Dulag - PETA
Halik ng Tarantula - PETA
Minsa'y Isang Gamu-gamo - PETA
Paano ko pinatay si Diana Ross - PETA
US Bases -/ UP Rep.
Bathala - PETA
DH - PETA
Smokey Mountain
1896 - PETA
Hanggang Dito na Lamang at Maraming salamat po - PETA
Romeo and Juliet D Komedi - PETA
Tatlong Pera - PETA
Jesus Christ Superstar
The Bomb - PETA
Boto ni Botong - PETA
El Filibusterismo - Gantimpala
Himala - Tanghalan Pilipino
Hipo
Illusiyonada
Ang Palasyo ni Valentin - PETA
Rosas (lab plays) - PETA
Ang Kamera ni Mang Leon - PETA
Bombita - Gantimpala
Tosca - PETA
Noli Fili Dekada 200 - PETA
Prinsesa Perlita - Paranaque

Writer
Friends in Love for film(1983) (story)
Diosa (for film)
Ded na si Lolo (for film)
Puting Buhok Puting Nitso (for television)
Miss Magpapa-make - up ako (for Television)
Tsikiting Masters - (for Film)

Death
Topacio  died on July 21, 2017. The news was confirmed by several posts from his friends in the film industry, who paid tribute to Topacio on social media. He was 65. According to a tweet from News5, the cause of death was lung cancer.

He was posthumously awarded Lamberto Avellana Memorial Award by the Film Academy of the Philippines in the 2019 Luna Awards.

References

1952 births
2017 deaths
Deaths from lung cancer in the Philippines
Filipino film directors
Filipino male comedians
Filipino male film actors
Filipino male stage actors
Filipino male television actors
Filipino screenwriters
Filipino television directors
Filipino television writers
Filipino theatre directors
Filipino gay actors
People from Manila